Charaxes penricei, the scarce savanna charaxes, is a butterfly in the family Nymphalidae. It is found in the Republic of the Congo, Angola, the Democratic Republic of the Congo, Zambia, Tanzania, Malawi and Zimbabwe.

Description
The original description written by Walter Rothschild is on
page 460 of Rothschild, W. and Jordan, K. (1898). A monograph of Charaxes and the allied prionopterous genera. Novitates Zoologicae Volume 5:545-601 ; 1899 Volume 6: 220-286 : 1900 Volume 7:287-524.  Descriptions and plates (monochrome photos).
Seitz- Ch. penricei Rothsch. Male: the under surface is marked almost as in etesipe ; but above the transverse band, as in the female of etesipe, is placed nearly in the middle of the hindwing and further from the distal margin than in etesipe male ; it is white or bluish white and from vein 2 of the hindwing to vein 2 of the forewing broad and continuous, then broken up into small spots, two each in cellules 2, 3 and 6 and one each in cellules 4, 5, 7 and in the cell; the ground-colour of the upper surface is bluish black. The female is unknown. This rare species has hitherto only been found in Angola. — peculiaris Lathy only differs from the type-form in having the black colour replaced by greenish. Rhodesia.
Similar to Charaxes etesipe but upperside median band further from the wing margins

Subspecies
Charaxes penricei penricei (eastern Angola, Democratic Republic of the Congo, Zambia, southern Tanzania, Malawi, eastern Zimbabwe)
Charaxes penricei dealbata van Someren, 1966(Congo, north-western Angola, western Democratic Republic of the Congo)
Charaxes penricei tanganyikae van Someren, 1966 (western Tanzania)

Biology
The habitat consists of savanna, especially Brachystegia woodland (Miombo).

The larvae feed on Entada species and Securidaca longipedunculata.

Notes on the biology of penricei are given by Pringle et al (1994).
.

Taxonomy
Closely related to Charaxes cacuthis and  Charaxes etesipe 

Charaxes penricei is a member of the species group Charaxes etesipe.

The clade members are: 
Charaxes etesipe (nominate)
Charaxes penricei 
Charaxes achaemenes 
Charaxes paradoxa
Charaxes cacuthis
Charaxes bwete
Charaxes cristalensis

References

Van Someren, Victor Gurney Logan (1966). Revisional notes on African Charaxes (Lepidoptera: Nymphalidae). Part III. Bulletin of the British Museum (Natural History) (Entomology) 45-101.
Van Someren, Victor Gurney Logan (1969). Revisional notes on African Charaxes (Lepidoptera: Nymphalidae). Part V. Bulletin of the British Museum (Natural History) (Entomology) 75-166.  Additional notes.

External links
   Images of C. penricei penricei Royal Museum for Central Africa (Albertine Rift Project)
 Images of C. penricei tanganyikae  (Albertine Rift Project)
Charaxes penricei images at Consortium for the Barcode of Life
Charaxes penricei penricei  images at BOLD
Charaxes cf. penricei  images at BOLD

Butterflies described in 1900
penricei
Butterflies of Africa
Taxa named by Walter Rothschild